Jon Christopher Conkling (born March 31, 1949) is an American writer. He is best known as the co-writer of the screenplay for the animated version of Lord of the Rings, directed by Ralph Bakshi and produced by Saul Zaentz. He has also published articles in BYU Studies, the Journal of Book of Mormon Studies and the Ensign, and wrote the 1979 book A Joseph Smith Chronology and an award-winning article on Melville's "Bartleby The Scrivener."

Education
Conkling studied at the University of California, Los Angeles, Dartmouth College, Brigham Young University.California State University, Dominguez Hills, and California State University, Northridge from which he received his teaching credentials.

Career
He wrote six complete scripts in an attempt to find the right approach for Bakshi's version of Lord of the Rings—one covered only a third of the epic, one tried to fit the entire saga into a single film, one tried to cut it in half; one version even focused on a re-telling by Pippin and Merry. There was a good deal of experimentation as to how to approach the enormous saga. Eventually, popular science fiction novelist, Peter S. Beagle, was called in to do some revisions, although Conkling still retained first credit on the final version. Lord of the Rings was nominated for a Hugo Award.

He was also a story consultant for the 1977 BYU Film Studio film The Mailbox and wrote The Emmitt Smith Story for BYU. He also wrote several management videos which appeared on PBS, and was also a writer for ABC's television series The Hardy Boys.

Conkling has taught a variety of courses at the American Jewish University in Bel-Air, California.  Prior to this he worked in advertising and public relations for several oil companies and Pool/Sarraille Advertising of Beverly Hills. He also wrote a paper entitled "The Dark Ages: The L.D.S. Church and Japan, 1924-1948" which is held by the Church History Archives and has been used as a source for published work by R. Lanier Britsch.

At AJU Chris Conkling created courses in literature of utopia and literature of evil, taught ancient Greek and Roman literature, and was faculty advisor for several years on the student newspaper. He currently works as a 12th grade English teacher and creative writing teacher at Sylmar High School's Math/Science Magnet, in Sylmar, Ca.

Personal life
Conkling is a Latter-day Saint.

Conkling and his wife Robin are the parents of six children. His mother was in the singing quartet The King Sisters, who had a weekly ABC television musical in the mid-sixties, called The King Family. His father, James Conkling, was a record executive, who became Capitol Record's first vice president, then president of Columbia Records, and founder and first president of Warner Bros. Records. He also helped to found the Grammy Awards  where he became the Grammy's first national chairman.

Conkling's entire family is rather accomplished. One cousin was musical director for the Sonny and Cher show, another the voice of Leonardo on "Teenage Mutant Ninja Turtles" for a decade, another was the female lead on the long-running TV program "My Three Sons" and yet another several created the signingtimes sign language videos. One sister, Jamie Miller, has published a half dozen books and another is married to a top Yankee Scout. One Uncle, big band leader and guitar virtuoso Alvino Rey, was the first inductee into the steel guitar hall of fame, another, Bob Clarke, produced and starred in such "B" monster movies as "The Hideous Sun Demon" and "Man from the Planet X," another, Bill Burch, was a Universal Studio executive and longtime protegee of Gene Autry. Among his second cousins is the wife of astronaut Buzz Aldrin, and the founders of the alternative rock band "The Arcade Fire."

Notes

External links

Maxwell Institute bio
LDS booklovers listing
Lds film bio

1949 births
20th-century American male writers
20th-century American screenwriters
Latter Day Saints from California
American male screenwriters
American television writers
Brigham Young University alumni
California State University, Dominguez Hills alumni
Dartmouth College alumni
Living people
University of California, Los Angeles alumni
Screenwriters from California
King family (show business)